Piz della Forcola is a mountain of the Lepontine Alps, located on the Swiss-Italian border. With a height of 2,675 metres, it is the highest summit of the chain lying south of the  pass named Forcola. On its western side it overlooks Val de la Forcola.

References

External links
 Piz della Forcola on Hikr

Mountains of the Alps
Mountains of Graubünden
Mountains of Lombardy
Italy–Switzerland border
International mountains of Europe
Lepontine Alps
Mountains of Switzerland
Two-thousanders of Switzerland
Soazza